Chazara staudingeri is a butterfly species belonging to the family Nymphalidae. It can be found from the Pamirs-Altai to Inner Tian-Shan.

The wingspan is 45–60 mm. The butterflies fly from July to August.

Subspecies
Chazara staudingeri staudingeri
Chazara staudingeri tadjika (Grum-Grshimailo, 1890) (Darvaz, Alai, western Pamirs)
Chazara staudingeri gultschensis Grum-Grshimailo, 1888 (eastern Alai, Inner Tian-Shan)

References

 Satyrinae of the Western Palearctic - Chazara staudingeri

Chazara
Butterflies described in 1882